Januszewski (feminine Januszewska) is a Polish surname. It is a toponymic surname deriver from any of locations named  Januszewo or Januszewice. The names of both locations derive from the Polish given name Janusz. The Lithuanized form is Janušauskas, Russified: Yanushevsky.

Notable people with the surname include:

 Artur Januszewski (born 1976), Polish footballer
 Franciszek Januszewski (1886–1953), one of the founders of the Józef Piłsudski Institute of America
 Gisela Januszewska (1867–1943), Austrian physician
 Hilary Paweł Januszewski (1907–1945), Carmelite, friar, priest; survived in the camp of Dachau until 1945
 Paweł Januszewski (born 1972), retired hurdler from Poland

References

Polish-language surnames